Operation Grand Canyon with Dan Snow is a British factual television series that was first broadcast on BBC Two on 5 January 2014. The two-part series was presented by Dan Snow.

Production
The series will be distributed by BBC Worldwide and is a BBC and Discovery Channel co-production.

Reception
Sam Wollaston of The Guardian wasn't convinced the series deserved two episodes. The Sentinel said "the experience should have been the blueprint for I'm A Celebrity".

References

External links
 
 

2014 British television series debuts
BBC television documentaries
English-language television shows